KZYQ (101.5 FM) is a radio station licensed to Eudora, Arkansas, United States. The office and studios are located at 830 Main Street in Greenville, Mississippi.  The station is owned by Larry Fuss, through licensee Contemporary Communications LLC, and operated by Delta Radio Network LLC

References

External links

ZYQ
Radio stations established in 2001
2001 establishments in Arkansas